Joseph Kevin Foster IV (born February 29, 1960), known as Kevin Foster, is a mountain biker best known for his 1990 tour across the Great Wall of China; his 1993-1995 tour of the highest points in the United States; and his 1997 tour across Cuba. Before finding fame as a bicyclist, he worked in the New York area as an actor and writer. In recent years, he has returned to the entertainment industry as an actor, writer, and producer.

Early life
Foster was born in Waterbury, Connecticut, to Joseph Adrian, an accountant, and Stella Lucia (née Vicedomini), a homemaker. His siblings included a younger brother and two younger sisters. His heritage is English, Irish, and Welsh from his father's side, and Spanish, Italian, and Jewish from his mother. Foster was raised in a predominantly Italian household in the North End section of Waterbury, later living in several nearby towns. Foster's mother gave her children a strong religious background that began as Catholic (he was an altar boy) and then moved on to Lutheran and Episcopalian (where he sang in the children's choir).

In 1968, Foster received an electric shock from a live wire  and fell approximately 30 feet. His memory was erased, and doctors told Foster's parents that he would never walk again. Foster did eventually regain some of his memory, although his memory of his friends, families, and relatives up to that point was gone. After four years of therapy, Foster was completely freed from his wheelchair. Foster credits the experience with changing his outlook on life, and leading him to dedicate himself as a Christian.

In 1972, as he was first learning to ride a bicycle, Foster saw a news broadcast of U.S. President Richard Nixon meeting with Chairman Mao Zedong atop the Great Wall of China. The sight inspired Foster to bicycle along the Wall from one end to the other, although his letters to both world leaders asking for permission received only a polite brush off from the White House.

Acting career
Foster had begun to act at the age of three, appearing in church and school plays and community theatre. At the age of 16, he began appearing at Connecticut's Southbury Playhouse and other summer stock and dinner theater venues around Connecticut.

In fall 1980, Foster entered the American Academy of Dramatic Arts in New York City. He later trained with Lee Strasberg at Actors Studio; Uta Hagen and Herbert Berghof at HB Studio; and with Stella Adler. He continued stage work in and around New York, working his way up from regional theatre, to "Shakespeare in the Park" with Joseph Papp, to off-Broadway, and finally to Broadway, where he appeared in the Vietnam drama, Go Home, Spec 5. He made his film debut in 1980 as an extra in Friday the 13th Part 2.

During this time, he supplemented his income by giving fencing lessons and writing for various newspapers, as well as writing two unpublished novels and several plays.

China tour plans and delays
In 1985, Foster returned to his dream of cycling the Great Wall of China. His hopes were bolstered by finding that skateboarding was now allowed on the Wall. With the backing of National Geographic and U.S. Senator Chris Dodd, in 1987 Foster received permission from the Chinese government to attempt to become the first person to travel the Wall's 2000 miles by bicycle.

Shortly after receiving permission, Foster was hit by a truck while bicycling, and had to cancel the tour. He attempted to revive the plan the next year, but had difficulty raising the necessary funds. In 1989, a week before Foster was to leave for China, the Tiananmen Square protests broke out. The tour was postponed once again, and several corporations dropped their sponsorship fearing a negative association from the massacre.

World record conquest
With time on his hands from the tour's cancellation, Foster broke the world record for traveling the length of the New York City Subway in October 1989, finishing in a time of 26 hours, 21 minutes, and 8 seconds.

Great Wall of China tour
A month after his world record conquest, Foster flew to China to begin preparations for a Great Wall tour the following spring. The Chinese government would allow Foster to cover some 2000 miles of the Great Wall from the furthest point west at Jiayuguan to the "First Gate Under Heaven" at Shanhaiguan in the east. In exchange, he would promote unity between the U.S. and China. The Chinese government hoped that this would bolster tourism, which had dropped to all-time lows since the events of Tiananmen Square.

Foster began his ride on May 9, 1990, wearing a red, white and blue helmet and uniform and riding a newly developed mountain bike in the same design. As he made his first tire tracks in the wall, Foster commented, "Now I know how Neil Armstrong felt when he walked on the moon."

Foster's Great Wall of China bicycle expedition lasted 50 days, during which he traveled 1,174.8 miles. He encountered challenges including sandstorms that at one point buried him; a crash that launched him through the Wall onto an ancient skeleton and broke three ribs; rain and hail storms, monsoons, and temperatures up to 130 degrees Fahrenheit. He traveled for 15–18 hours per day, covering 25–30 miles, and lost approximately 30 pounds over his three months in China. He and his five-man crew (who carried food and water in their Jeeps) would occasionally stay in a nearby town to refresh themselves.

Due to military restrictions, Foster was not allowed to cycle the 1500 miles that made up the Wall's middle section, the area that bordered China from Inner Mongolia. He and his team would have to divert north to Hohhot, Inner Mongolia, and then south toward Beijing. Since he was forced to comply, Foster decided to make another adventure of it, receiving permission to race a pair of Mongolian horsemen for several hundred yards. The race was a photo finish with Foster winning by the width of his bike tire.

In the Badaling section of the Wall just north of Beijing, Foster was so mobbed by press and tourists he had to walk his bicycle until the crowds thinned. It was also in this section that he was able to fulfill another dream by sleeping in the towers where the Wall's guards and their families had slept centuries earlier. Other sections that stood out for Foster were Mutianyu because it was like riding a roller coaster; Pankou, which Chairman Mao had flooded and the only way across was by row boat; and Simatai, which was so steep and narrow that one could only pass through it by crawling on their hands and knees.

On June 29, 1990, Foster finished his tour at Shanhaiguan, where he was met by a hoard of tourists, media, hosts, and sponsors. He was also met by guards, who detained Foster and his crew for an hour of interrogation. He earned the 1990 Cyclist of the Year award over his friend, Greg LeMond, who had won the Tour de France; the cycling industry dubbed Foster's journey as, "the last, greatest, cycling adventure on the face of the earth." While Foster had initially planned to return to his acting career, he was convinced by his manager, Charlie Litsky, that he could do much better as an adventure cyclist than a starving artist.

American Summits tour
Following the Great Wall tour, Foster moved from Ojai, California, to the community of Kaweah, at the base of Sequoia National Park. As he was cycling in the mountains one day, he found a "no biking" sign in an area where he was used to training, as part of a battle by the Sierra Club to keep bikes off the trails.

The encounter inspired Foster's next tour: a two-year tour called American Summits, which would place a full-scale mountain bike atop the highest natural point in each of the fifty states. Most of Foster's previous sponsors returned, although his bicycle changed from a Cannondale to a Klein, still in the red, white, and blue color scheme.

The tour started in the summer of 1993 with multiple setbacks. Just before the tour began, Foster's manager died suddenly at the age of 33. In his first state, Arizona, Foster got lost on the way down from the summit. However, Foster was able to summit 48 state highpoints on his first try. California's Mount Whitney (the highest natural point in the continental United States) took him two attempts to succeed. He was placed under arrest at the base of Mount Rainier, Washington state's highpoint; after a court hearing held in a parking lot, Foster was allowed to take his bike to the summit as long as he left his wheels behind.

The last stop on the tour was Alaska's Mount McKinley, the highest natural point on the North American continent. In the summer of 1995, Foster and his team of three others were dropped off by plane at the mountain's 7500-foot base during a blizzard. Immediately afterward, as the plane tried to depart, it was flipped upside-down and destroyed, although the pilot escaped with minor injuries. After they reached the 17,200-foot level and made camp with about 75 other climbers, a storm trapped the group for six days, leading to three deaths. As the storm rose above them briefly, Foster and his team reluctantly retreated, and his sponsors declined to fund a return trip.

The tour received significant press coverage. Following the tour, the Sierra Club and members of several cycling organizations sat down to negotiate sharing the country's trails.

Tour de Cuba
Since childhood, Foster had desired to visit Cuba. Following the American Summits tour, Foster accepted an invitation to the country from Cuban president Fidel Castro and began planning a tour across the nation, in spite of the United States embargo against Cuba prohibiting Americans from visiting or doing business there. Several of Foster's sponsors declined to support the tour, and U.S. senator Jesse Helms called for Foster to be arrested upon his return.

Foster began the Tour de Cuba on November 21, 1997. Foster's journey covered 1,158 miles, from the easternmost point at Maisí to Playa Larga on the Zapata Peninsula. Unlike his previous tours, Foster traveled this one with a co-rider representing Cuba, Alfredo Rodriguez Martinez. Like his previous tours, this one included an arrest, when Maisí's captain of the guard could not initially verify that Foster was a guest of Castro. The matter was cleared up the next day, and Foster was able to begin his ride. Over the three-week tour, Foster visited many of Cuba's landmarks, such as the grave of national hero José Martí in Santiago de Cuba; Cuba's highest natural point in Pico Turquino; and the Bay of Pigs, which had become a luxury resort. The tour completed on December 11, 1997. The tour would be the longest bicycle tour in Cuba's history until Ben Graham Jones' crossing two decades later.

On his way home that December, Foster was met by government officials at the Toronto, Ontario, Canada, airport while trying to board a connecting flight. Foster's passport was scanned and sent to Washington, D.C., but no arrest or further confrontations ever materialized.

In January 1998, Foster announced his retirement from being an adventure cyclist, having proved that a mountain bike could be taken anywhere with the right motivation.

Post-retirement projects
In the years following his retirement, Foster made many personal appearances at events for his sponsors and for charity, as well as private engagements. Since 2006, he has held an annual charity bike ride in Sequoia National Park to benefit Smile Train, an organization providing surgery to children with cleft lips and palates.

Foster returned to acting with the 2005 feature film Yesterday's Dreams, which he wrote, produced, and starred in. In 2008, he co-wrote and executive produced the documentary Hollywood on Fire, about Christian influence in the film industry. The film was released in 2009.

In 2009, Foster co-produced his friend Danny Saber's debut album, Saber Bytes.

References

External links
 
 
 Kevin Foster on the Aerospoke web site
 Kevin Foster on the Marquis Who's Who web site
 Kevin Foster on YouTube

1960 births
American male cyclists
American mountain bikers
Living people
Male actors from California
Writers from California
Sportspeople from Waterbury, Connecticut
Sportspeople from New York City
American people of English descent
American people of Welsh descent
American people of Irish descent
American people of Italian descent
American people of Spanish descent
American people of Jewish descent
People from Tulare County, California
People from Ojai, California
Sportspeople from Ventura County, California